American Daylight is a 2004 Indian film production in Hollywood. The film is directed by Roger Christian and produced by Kaleidoscope Entertainment.  The film stars Nick Moran as Lawrence, an American music executive, who falls for Sujata (Koel Purie), a call center worker in India, then flies halfway around the planet to meet her. Nick's journey is complicated by his wife (Jennifer Siebel), Sujata's boss (Vijay Raaz) who sees Lawrence as a romantic rival, and the assassin hired by that boss to kill Lawrence.

After October 2004 screenings at the London Film Festival and Pusan International Film Festival, the film opened wide in India on 17 December 2004. The film was premiered in the Marché du Film section of the 2005 Cannes Film Festival.

The film's crew included cinematographer Hinman Dhamija, editor Alan Strachan, composers Amaan Ali Khan and Ayaan Ali Khan, art director Yoyendra Tyagi, and costume designer Shaahid Amir.

References

Sources

External links

2004 films
Indian crime drama films
Films directed by Roger Christian
2000s English-language films
2004 crime drama films
English-language Indian films